Hong Kong Ghost Stories is a 2011 Hong Kong horror film directed by Wong Jing and Patrick Kong.

Cast

References

External links

2011 films
Hong Kong horror films
2011 horror films
Films directed by Wong Jing
Films directed by Patrick Kong
Hong Kong supernatural horror films
Hong Kong psychological horror films
2010s Hong Kong films